The Barauni–Guwahati railway line connects Barauni, Saharsa, Purnia and Katihar in the Indian state of Bihar and  in Assam via Siliguri, Jalpaiguri, Cooch Behar and Alipurduar in West Bengal. It is a linkage of prime importance for Northeastern India with India.

Sections

The -long trunk line, been treated in more detail in smaller sections:
 Barauni–Katihar, Saharsa and Purnia sections
 Katihar–New Jalpaiguri, Thakurganj and Siliguri sections
 New Jalpaiguri–New Bongaigaon section
 New Bongaigaon–Guwahati section

History

Pre-independence era
The earliest railway tracks in Assam were laid in the Dibrugarh area in 1882 for the transportation of tea and coal. The first passenger railway was also in that area.

Linking Guwahati was the challenge. In response to the demands of tea planters in Assam for a rail link to Chittagong port, the Assam Bengal Railway started construction of a railway track on the eastern side of Bengal in 1891. A  track between Chittagong and Comilla was opened to traffic in 1895. The Comilla–Akhaura–Kulaura–Badarpur section was opened in 1896–1898 and finally extended to Lumding in 1903. The Assam Bengal Railway constructed a branch line to Guwahati, connecting the city to the eastern line in 1900.

During the period 1884–1889, Assam Behar State Railway linked Parbatipur, now in Bangladesh,  with Katihar in Bihar. North Bengal State Railway had opened a metre-gauge line from Parbatipur and the line subsequently got extended beyond the Teesta, and through Geetaldaha to Golokganj in Assam.  During the 1900–1910 period, the Eastern Bengal Railway built the Golakganj–Amingaon branch line, thus connecting the western bank of the Brahmaputra to Bihar and the rest of India. Katihar got linked to Barauni around the turn of the century.

Assam Link project
With the partition of India railways in Assam got delinked from those in the rest of India. Fakiragram was connected to the Indian railway system in 1950 through the Indian portion of North Bengal with a metre-gauge track. The New Jalpaiguri–New Bongaigaon section was partly new construction, partly old line converted to  broad gauge in 1966. Broad gauge reached Guwahati in 1984.

Bridges
Including major & minor bridges, approx. 100 Bridges falls in Barauni-Guwahati mainline. 

The construction of the -long Rajendra Setu near Barauni in 1959 provided the first opportunity to link the railway tracks on the north and south banks of the Ganges.

The -long Kosi River Bridge at Kursela connects Barauni & Katihar.

The -long Farakka Barrage carries a rail-cum-road bridge across the Ganges. The rail bridge was thrown open to the public in 1971, thereby linking Kolkata with North Bengal and Assam.

The -long Teesta River bridge, the -long Jaldhaka River bridge & the -long Torsha River bridge connects New Jalpaiguri with New Coochbehar section of Barauni - Guwahati mainline. 

The construction of the -long Saraighat Bridge, the first rail-cum-road bridge across the Brahmaputra, was an event of great excitement. Jawaharlal Nehru, India's first prime minister formally laid the foundation stone on 10 January 1960 and it was completed in 1962, connecting the two parts of the metre-gauge railways in Assam.

The construction of the -long Naranarayan Setu in 1998 lessened the load on Saraighat Bridge. This line is the alternate railway link of  New Bongaigaon - Rangiya - Guwahati section.

Electrification
Electrification of the -long Barauni–Katihar–Guwahati section was sanctioned. As of July 2021, Katihar New Srirampur Assam and Bongaigaon Kamakhya section has been electrified, and many electric passenger trains are going up to NCB.

References

|

5 ft 6 in gauge railways in India
Rail transport in Assam
Rail transport in West Bengal
Railway lines in Bihar
Transport in Barauni
Transport in Guwahati